Bolo is a 1987 Breakout clone written for the Atari ST with the high resolution monochrome monitor. It was later remade for Macintosh and MS-DOS. Bolo was written by Meinolf Schneider, who wrote the Oxyd games. Bolo is in the same vein as Taito's Arkanoid with numerous additions such as gravity, exploding bricks, and tunneling.

References

External links
Bolo at Atari Mania

1987 video games
Atari ST games
Breakout clones
DOS games
Europe-exclusive video games
Classic Mac OS games
Video games developed in Germany